Mahmuda Amin Shaina (born February 26) popularly known as Shaina Amin is a former Bangladeshi television and film actress and also a model. She began her career as a model appearing in commercials in 2005. In 2006 she made her debut in television drama performing in Cross Connection.  She then has appeared in several television drama, film and series till now.

In 2011, Amin first acted in feature film Meherjaan directed by Rubaiyat Hossain. In the film she played the role of Young Meherjaan. She appeared in two more films released in 2012 and 2015, which are Pita (The Father) directed by Masud Akhand and Putro Ekhon Poyshawala directed by Nargis Akter.

Early life and education
Shaina was born in Mecca, Saudi Arabia to parents of Bangladeshi descent.
 Her father, Nurul Amin, is a businessman, and her mother, Hasna Amin, is a housewife. At the age of one and half, her parents moved to Bangladesh and settled at Lalmatia in Dhaka. She learned dance from Shibli Mohammad and admitted into a dance school called "Nrityangon". She went to Lalmatia Women's College in Dhaka and currently studies there.

Career

Modeling and television
In 2005, Amin began her career as a model, appearing in a TV commercial of "Sunsilk hair shampoo". She was a ten grade student back then. The next year, in 2006 she appeared in television dramas. Her first TV drama was "Cross Connection" directed by Badrul Islam Saud. From on, She continued to perform in television dramas and commercials.

In 2008, Amin appeared in Premer Ongko, a television drama directed by Abul Al Sayeed. She also performed in telefilm Mon Uchaton.

In 2011, Amin acted in several television series including Life is beautiful, Coming Soon and Lokaloy. She also appeared in television drama V.I.P. and Abu Karim. In the year, she also appeared with Antu Karim in the music video for song "Ek Jibon" written by Shahid and sung by Shahid and Subhamita Banerjee.

Between 2012 and 2013, Amin acted in several television drama, series and telefilm including Opratisthanik Shikkha Sofor (A Unofficial Excursion), Priyo Maa (Dear Mother), College, Relation, Antoheen and Genie Made In Ginijira.

In 2014, Amin appeared in My Ex-girlfriend, a valentine special drama aired on 14 February. She also appeared in two television series Colour and Daag, and television dramas including Shopner Shuru o Shesh, Preyoshi, Shei Meyeti, In a Relationship and Shadharon Gyan.

Personal life 
Shaina married to a UK expatriate Masud Rana on 15 March 2015. They have a son and a daughter.

Film 
In 2011, Amin made her film debut with Rubaiyat Hossain's full feature film Meherjan, and she played the role "Young Meher" in the film. Popular Indian actor Victor Banerjee and actress Jaya Bachchan and Bangladeshi actor Humayun Faridi also starred in the film. The film was released on 21 January 2011 in Bangladesh. In 2012, she appeared in Pita (The Father) directed by Masud Akhand and produced by Impress Telefilm Limited. Both films are based on Bangladesh war of liberation in 1971. Amin played the role of Pollobi, a Hindu pregnant wife during the war. The film released on 28 December 2012 in Bangladesh  and premiered on 5 May 2013 at the Wilshire theater of Beverly Hills, LA. In the same year, she signed for another film Putro Ekhon Poysawala directed by Nargis Akter and starring prominent actress Bobita, Mamnun Hasan Emon, Farah Ruma and Omar Ayaz Oni. The film was supposed to release early in 2014 but delayed for several reason. Finally it was released on 15 January 2015.

Filmography

Film

Television

Music videos

Modeling

TV commercials
 Sunsilk Hair Shampoo (2005)
 Arku Gura Masala
 Pran Chatni
 Rexona
 Cute Beauty Shop
 Shourav Mehedi
 Danish Condensed Milk 
 Apan Jewllers
 Tibet Fairness Cream
 Tibet Pomade Cream (2010)
 Tibet Pumpkin Hair Oil
 Racsun Television (2012)
 Parachute Bangladesh Advansed Hair Oil (2012) 
 Chandan Facewash
 Fair & Care Fairness Cream

Magazine
 Splash Fashion Magazine, January (2014)

References

Living people
People from Dhaka
Bangladeshi film actresses
Bangladeshi television actresses
Bangladeshi female models
21st-century Bangladeshi actresses
Year of birth missing (living people)